Kang Sung-jin (born January 13, 1971) is a South Korean actor. Kang acted in the lead role in The Humanist (2001), APT (2006), Mission Possible: Kidnapping Granny K (2007) and Life Is Cool (2008).

Personal
His niece is actress Kang Byul.

Filmography

Film

Television series

Variety show

Theater

Discography

References

External links 

 Kang Sung-jin Fan Cafe at Daum 
 
 
 
 

1971 births
Living people
South Korean male film actors
South Korean male television actors